Paddy J. McLogan (1899 – 21/22 July 1964) was President of Sinn Féin from 1950–52 and again from 1954 to 1962.

Born in Markethill, Co Armagh, he spent some time in Scotland. He joined the Irish Republican Brotherhood in 1913 and the Irish Volunteers. The same year he was imprisoned by the British authorities and went on a hunger strike in 1917 with Thomas Ashe.  He was in command of the Irish Republican Army in South Armagh during the Irish War of Independence.

After the Irish Civil War, he settled in Portlaoise and became a publican. From 1933 to 1938 he was an abstentionist Republican Member of Parliament for South Armagh constituency of the Parliament of Northern Ireland.

He chaired the 1934 IRA Army Convention. In 1936, the IRA set up Cumann Poblachta na hÉireann, with McLogan as chairman and one of many Sinn Féin members of the party. 

He was interned from 1940 to 1941. In 1945 he chaired the first IRA Army Convention after the war.

In 1950 he succeeded Margaret Buckley as President of Sinn Féin, until 1952, and resumed that role in 1954 and was to remain in the post until 1962, when he resigned from the party. He was regarded as helping to rebuild the party after World War II.  Around this time, he also owned a public house on the Main Street in Portlaoise, Co. Laois, which is now known as the one and only "Ryan's". A plaque commemorates his former proprietorship.

He died on 20 or 21 July 1964, at his home at 11 Herbert Road, Blanchardstown, County Dublin, as a result of an accident involving a 9mm Walther pistol.

References

External links
 Election results for Armagh constituencies 

1899 births
1964 deaths
Irish Republican Army (1919–1922) members
Members of the Irish Republican Brotherhood
Members of the House of Commons of Northern Ireland 1933–1938
Irish republicans interned without trial
Sinn Féin politicians
Leaders of Sinn Féin
Politicians from County Armagh
Accidental deaths in the Republic of Ireland
Firearm accident victims
Members of the House of Commons of Northern Ireland for County Armagh constituencies
Deaths by firearm in the Republic of Ireland